10 Murray Street was the address of the State Offices building in Hobart, Australia, and the name by which the building is frequently known. It was a Brutalist office building located behind Parliament House and close to Salamanca Place. The building was fully occupied by the State Government of Tasmania and is located next to Parliament House.  They were directly linked via a skyway. 10 Murray Street was demolished in 2018 as part of the Parliament Square redevelopment.

History
Construction commenced of the State Offices building in July 1966 and was completed in 1969 The building has three ground floor levels, a reception level raised on broad steps above Murray Street, 10 floors of offices and a penthouse for the plant room and a caretaker's office.  To avoid the expense of importing steel it was built of reinforced concrete with an externally expressed frame. The windows were recessed to avoid a glass curtain wall effect. The building was designed by the firm of Hartley Wilson and Partners, with the original design by Dirk Bolt and with later revisions by David Hartley Wilson.

Demolition

In 2009 the State Government announced Citta Property Group as the successful applicant for its plans to sell 10 Murray Street for the redevelopment of the "Parliament Square" precinct. Citta plans to give the square a Federation Square feel with the demolition of 10 Murray Street and the opening up of the Murray Street side. As well as this Citta plans to upgrade and maintain most of the older Davey Street Facing buildings as well as building a new seven-storey building facing Salamanca Place. The 19th century building known as the Red Brick Building will be demolished. There will also be shops, cafes and an amphitheatre with a large screen for public events. The redevelopment was originally to have been completed in 2012, with works beginning in March 2010, but the project has been delayed due to an appeal by the "Save 10 Murray" group, led by Briony Kidd. Three proposals were shortlisted for the redevelopment during the tender process, of which one design would retain and retrofit 10 Murray Street, while the two other plans would demolish the building.

Demolition works began in September 2017, and by August 2018, the building was fully demolished.

See also 
 List of tallest buildings in Hobart

References

External links

 Save10Murray Website

Office buildings completed in 1969
Brutalist architecture in Australia
Buildings and structures in Hobart
Landmarks in Hobart
Demolished buildings and structures in Hobart
Buildings and structures demolished in 2018